In molecular biology, the GHMP kinase family is a family of kinase enzymes. Members of this family include homoserine kinases , galactokinases , and mevalonate kinases. These kinases make up the GHMP kinase superfamily of ATP-dependent enzymes. These enzymes are involved in the biosynthesis of isoprenes and amino acids as well as in carbohydrate metabolism. These enzymes contain, in their N-terminal section, a conserved Gly/Ser-rich region which is probably involved in the binding of ATP. The C-terminal domain of homoserine kinase has a central alpha-beta plait fold and an insertion of four helices, which, together with the N-terminal fold, creates a novel nucleotide binding fold.

References

Protein families